Wimmera Highway is a 345 kilometre highway that connects the towns of Marong, Victoria and Naracoorte, South Australia, through the major junctions of Sunraysia Highway, Henty Highway and Western Highway.

History
The passing of the Highways and Vehicles Act of 1924 through the Parliament of Victoria provided for the declaration of State Highways, roads two-thirds financed by the State government through the Country Roads Board (later VicRoads). Wimmera Highway was declared a State Highway in the 1959/60 financial year, from St Arnaud via Rupanyup, Horsham and Edenhope to the South Australian border (for a total of 146 miles); before this declaration, these roads were referred to as Hamilton–Edenhope–Aspley Road, Edenhope–Horsham Road, Horsham–Murtoa Road, Rupanyup–Murtoa Road, Marnoo–St Arnaud Road and Navarre Road. The highway was extended a further 90km east (along the former Bendigo–St Arnaud Road) to Marong, just outside Bendigo, in the late 1990s.

A new bridge over Loddon River in Newbridge (on the then-Bendigo-St Arnaud Road) was opened in 1996, replacing an older, flood-prone structure that could no longer be maintained in a cost-effective manner, at a cost of $1.4 million.

Wimmera Highway was signed as State Route 130 between Naracoorte and St Arnaud in 1986; with Victoria's conversion to the newer alphanumeric system in the late 1990s, this was replaced by route C240 between Naracoorte and Marong. Subsequent road upgrades allowed the Victorian section to be reallocated route B240 in 2003.

The passing of the Road Management Act 2004 granted the responsibility of overall management and development of Victoria's major arterial roads to VicRoads: in 2004, VicRoads re-declared the road as Wimmera Highway (Arterial #6110), beginning at the South Australian border and ending at Calder Alternative Highway in Marong.

Major intersections

See also

 Highways in Australia
 Highways in South Australia
 Highways in Victoria

References

External links

Highways in Australia
Highways in Victoria (Australia)
Highways in South Australia